is a Japanese politician of the Democratic Party of Japan, a member of the House of Councillors in the Diet (national legislature). A native of Kurume, Fukuoka and graduate of Kyoto University, he worked at Tokyo Bank from 1984 to 2004. He was elected to the House of Councillors for the first time in 2004.

References

External links 
 Official website in Japanese.

Members of the House of Councillors (Japan)
Kyoto University alumni
People from Kurume
1961 births
Living people
Democratic Party of Japan politicians